Baikove Cemetery is a historic cemetery memorial in Holosiiv Raion of Kyiv, Ukraine. It is a National Historic Landmark of Ukraine and is known as a necropolis of distinguished people. It was established in 1833. Among the buried, it includes Leonid Kravchuk, Mykhailo Hrushevskyi, Lesya Ukrainka, Slava Stetsko, Viacheslav Chornovil, Oles Honchar, Ivan Nechuy-Levytsky, Danylo Lyder, Olena Pchilka, Mykhailo Starytsky, Oleksandr Bilash, Ostap Vyshnya, Ivan Mykolaychuk, Volodymyr Shcherbytsky, Leonid Telyatnikov, Mikhail Vaschenko-Zakharchenko, Oleg Antonov, Viktor Bannikov and Valeri Lobanovsky and the soldier that raised the soviet flag over Berlin: Aleksey Kovalev.

History 

The cemetery was established in 1833. It has got its name from the nearby Baikovo estate. The oldest part of the cemetery is located south of the present vul. Baikova. The biggest part is located north of the street and was established in the 1880s. It is partly surrounded by a wall. Besides the Orthodox graves there are also Catholic and Lutheran sections.

In Soviet times the Baikove cemetery became the main necropolis of the Kyiv's intelligentsia, middle and upper classes. Many of the headstones became pieces of monumental art.  Also after the Ukrainian independence the cemetery has remained the most prestigious burial ground in the city.  87 are on the List of national landmarks of cultural heritage in Kyiv.

An Orthodox Church (Ascension of the Lord) in Byzantine style was built at the cemetery in 1884–1889. It was built on the proceeds from the sale of burial places. During the Soviet times it was preserved as a memorial hall for funeral ceremonies. Today it is again used as a church. In 1975 a new crematorium in modern style was built in the western part of the cemetery.

Gallery

See also
 People buried at the Baikove
 List of cultural heritage landmarks of national significance in Kyiv

Further reading

 Ruta Malikenaite (ed): Touring Kyiv. Guidebook, pp. 153–157 (Baltija Druk 2002).

External links
Entsyklopediya Kyiv
 Mysterious places of Kyiv: Baikove Cemetery (Загадкові місця Києва: Байкове кладовище). ForUM. 28 November 2011 
 Habdrakhimov, D. Baikove Cemetery: so who is being buried at the elite necropolis? (Байкове кладовище: так кого ж ховають на "елітному некрополі"?) Ukrainian National News (UNN). 12 June 2012
 In Kyiv hunters for metal destroyed the Baikove Cemetery (У Києві мисливці за металом розгромили Байкове кладовище). Segodnya. 8 October 2015.
 Malenkov, R. Baikove Necropolis (Байковий некрополь). Ukraina Incognita. 2007
 

 
Cemeteries in Kyiv
Holosiivskyi District
National Landmarks in Kyiv
Eastern Orthodox cemeteries
Lutheran cemeteries
Roman Catholic cemeteries
Buildings and structures in Kyiv
Landmarks in Kyiv
1833 establishments in the Russian Empire
19th-century establishments in Ukraine
Monuments and memorials in Ukraine